Vaughan Jones (born 8 September 1959 in Tonyrefail) is a Welsh former professional footballer. Jones played his club football for Bristol Rovers, Cardiff City, Newport County, Inter Cardiff and Bath City before finishing his playing career at Cheltenham Town. He went on to be a youth coach at Bristol Rovers before becoming Assistant Manager at Bath City in November 2003, but a year later had left his job in mysterious circumstances.

A Welsh youth international, he also attained two Under-21 caps for Wales.

Notes
A.  The appearances and goals figures in the infobox for Jones's second permanent spell with Bristol Rovers cover both the loan period and the permanent contract, which Neil Brown fails to separate.

References

External links
Welsh Premier profile

1959 births
Living people
People from Tonyrefail
Sportspeople from Rhondda Cynon Taf
Welsh footballers
Wales youth international footballers
Wales under-21 international footballers
Association football defenders
Bristol Rovers F.C. players
Newport County A.F.C. players
Cardiff City F.C. players
Bath City F.C. players
Cheltenham Town F.C. players
English Football League players
Cymru Premier players